Yasunari is a masculine Japanese given name.

Possible writings
Yasunari can be written using many different combinations of kanji characters. Here are some examples:

靖成, "peaceful, turn into"
靖也, "peaceful, to be"
康成, "healthy, turn into"
康也, "healthy, to be"
安成, "tranquil, turn into"
安也, "tranquil, to be"
保成, "preserve, turn into"
保也, "preserve, to be"
泰成, "peaceful, turn into"
泰也, "peaceful, to be"
易成, "divination, turn into"

The name can also be written in hiragana やすなり or katakana ヤスナリ.

Notable people with the name
, Japanese sport wrestler
, Japanese swimmer
, Japanese footballer
, a Japanese karate expert 
, Japanese jockey
, Japanese writer
, Japanese sumo wrestler

Japanese masculine given names